The men's +100 kg judo competition at the 2012 Summer Paralympics was held on 1 September at ExCeL London.

Results

Repechage

References

External links
 

M101
Judo at the Summer Paralympics Men's Heavyweight